Patscherkofel is a mountain and ski area in the Alps, in Tyrol in western Austria, 7 km (4 mi.) south of Innsbruck.

Geology and Soils
Quartz phyllite is the dominant bedrock, with gneiss and feldspar at the peak. Calcium-rich bedrock such as basalt, chalk and dolomite also occurs but is too scarce to have much influence on the soils of this severely glaciated mountain. Acid brown earth, podzolized brown earth and iron-humus podzol are the dominant soil types.

Winter Olympics
During both the 1964 and 1976 Winter Olympics, the mountain was the venue for the men's downhill race, along with the bobsleigh and luge competitions in neighboring Igls. The other five alpine skiing events were held at Axamer Lizum.

Ski legend Franz Klammer of Austria, then age 22, won his Olympic gold medal at Patscherkofel, dramatically edging out defending Olympic champion Bernhard Russi of Switzerland by 0.33 seconds in the 1976 Downhill.

Egon Zimmermann, also of Austria, took the gold medal a dozen years earlier in the 1964 Olympic downhill. His winning time was 2:18.16, more than a half minute behind Klammer's.

Climate

Video
You Tube – Franz Klammer's winning run (from ABC Sports)

References

External links

  – ski area – 
 Sports Illustrated – cover – 16-Feb-1976 – Franz Klammer at Patscherkofel
 Alpine Ski Maps.com – winter map of Innsbruck area
 Alpine Ski Maps.com – summer map of Innsbruck area

Venues of the 1964 Winter Olympics
Venues of the 1976 Winter Olympics
Olympic alpine skiing venues
Venues of the 2012 Winter Youth Olympics
Mountains of the Alps
Mountains of Tyrol (state)
Tux Alps